Around the World in 80 Plates was an American reality competition television series that debuted May 9, 2012, on Bravo. The series follows twelve chefs competing in a culinary race across ten countries in 44 days and is hosted by professional chefs Curtis Stone and Cat Cora.

Contestants
In order of elimination:
Clara Moore (Hometown: St. Louis, Missouri)
Sai Pituk (Hometown: El Paso, Texas)
Keven "Cheven" Lee (Hometown: Chatsworth, California)
Chaz Brown (Hometown: Voorhees, New Jersey)
Gary Walker (Hometown: Detroit, Michigan)
Nick Lacasse (Hometown: Burlington, Vermont)
Jenna Johansen (Hometown: Boulder, Colorado)
Nicole Lou (Hometown: San Jose, California)
John Vermiglio (Hometown: Clinton Township, Michigan )
Steve "Nookie" Postal (Hometown: Cambridge, Massachusetts)
Liz Garrett (Hometown: Los Angeles, California) – Runner-up
Avery Pursell (Hometown: Los Angeles, California) – Winner / Fan Favorite

Contestant progress

 (MVC) The contestant was a member of the winning team in that episode's Take-Over Challenge and was selected as the Most Valuable Chef.
 (WIN) The contestant was a member of the winning team in that episode's Take-Over Challenge.
 (IN) The contestant was not a member of the winning team, but did not receive any votes for elimination.
 [IN (-)] The contestant was not a member of the winning team and received at least one vote for elimination.
 (OUT) The contestant was not a member of the winning team, received the most elimination votes and was eliminated.

Episodes

International broadcasters
 Canada (English) - Food Network
 Canada (French) - Zeste
 Australia - TLC
 Italy - Sky
 Spain - Ten

References

2010s American cooking television series
2010s American reality television series
2012 American television series debuts
2012 American television series endings
English-language television shows
Bravo (American TV network) original programming
Television series by Magical Elves
Television shows filmed in England
Television shows filmed in France
Television shows filmed in Spain
Television shows filmed in Morocco
Television shows filmed in Italy
Television shows filmed in Thailand
Television shows filmed in Hong Kong
Television shows filmed in Argentina
Television shows filmed in Uruguay
Television shows filmed in California
Reality competition television series